Mont-sous-Vaudrey is a commune in the Jura department in Bourgogne-Franche-Comté in eastern France.

Population

Personalities 
Mont-sous-Vaudrey was the birthplace of Jules Grévy (1813-1891), President of the French Third Republic.

See also 
 Communes of the Jura department

References 

Communes of Jura (department)